Al-Sabah is a daily newspaper published in Kuwait. It also owns a TV channel.

See also
List of newspapers in Kuwait

References

External links
 Official website

2007 establishments in Kuwait
Arabic-language newspapers
Newspapers published in Kuwait
Publications established in 2007